"Don't Play Nice" is the debut single of English singer-songwriter Teddy Sinclair, who released the song under the name Verbalicious. The song was written by Sinclair, Mowgli, Hugo Lira, Thomas Gustafsson, and Tobias Lindell, with production helmed by the latter three. The song became a hit in the United Kingdom, reaching number 11 on the UK Singles Chart. It also found some success in Ireland, where it peaked at number 48.

Background
The single was released commercially only in Ireland, Italy, and the United Kingdom. It is Teddy Sinclair's only single released under the name Verbalicious. Though the song charted well, due to poor sales, no album materialised. The song was released on the dance label All Around the World. The single was nominated for the 2005 Popjustice £20 Music Prize, but it lost to "Wake Me Up" by Girls Aloud.

Track listings
UK CD single
 "Don't Play Nice" (original edit) – 2:50
 "Don't Play Nice" (Random radio mix) – 2:48
 "Don't Play Nice" (Mowgli club rub) – 4:43
 "Hey Boy" – 2:50
 "Don't Play Nice" (video)

Italian CD single
 "Don't Play Nice" (original edit) – 2:50
 "Don't Play Nice" (Random radio mix) – 2:48
 "Don't Play Nice" (Mowgli club rub) – 4:43

Italian 12-inch single
A. "Don't Play Nice" (Mowgli club rub) – 4:43
B. "Don't Play Nice" (original edit) – 2:50

Credits and personnel
Credits are taken from the Italian 12-inch single sleeve.

Studios
 Recorded at Random Studios (Gothenburg, Sweden)
 Mixed at the Mixroom (Gothenburg, Sweden)
 Remixed at Mowgli Music (London, England)

Personnel
 Teddy Sinclair – writing (as Verbalicious), remixing
 Mowgli – writing, extended remixing
 Hugo Lira – writing, production, recording
 Thomas Gustafsson – writing, production, recording
 Tobias Lindell – writing, production, mixing

Charts

Release history

References

2005 debut singles
2005 songs
All Around the World Productions singles
Natalia Kills songs
Songs written by Natalia Keery-Fisher